Nebria cordicollis ticinensis is a subspecies of ground beetle in the Nebriinae subfamily that is endemic to Switzerland.

References

cordicollis ticinensis
Beetles described in 1951
Beetles of Europe
Endemic fauna of Switzerland